A Total Letdown is the second studio album by Babyland, released on March 4, 1994, by Flipside Records.

Reception

Ned Raggett of AllMusic says, "Babyland continue the same perfect bland of aggro-electronics, personal/political punk lyrical delivery" and "the few changes there are turn up as understated rather than obvious, especially a continued embrace of careful additional touches to flesh out the songs." Alternative Press also lauded the album, saying "the band literally hit the nail on the head of all the confusion, resentment, anger, and frustration felt by an entire generation."

Track listing

Personnel 
Adapted from the A Total Letdown liner notes.

Babyland
 Dan Gatto – lead vocals, keyboards
 Michael Smith – percussion

Production and design
 Aartvark – cover art, photography
 Rusty Cusick – engineering (2, 4, 5, 7, 9, 10)
 Jon Steinhoff – engineering (1, 3, 6, 8, 11)

Release history

References

External links 
 
 A Total Letdown at iTunes

1994 albums
Babyland albums
Flipside (fanzine) albums